Michael Anthony Sells (born May 8, 1949) is John Henry Barrows Professor of Islamic History and Literature in the Divinity School and in the Department of Comparative Literature at the University of Chicago.
Michael Sells studies and teaches in the areas of Qur'anic studies, Sufism, Arabic and Islamic love poetry, mysticism (Greek, Islamic, Christian, and Jewish), and religion and violence.

Work
He completed a new and expanded edition of his 1999 book Approaching the Qur'an: the Early Revelations which was the center of the case Yacovelli v. Moeser about the University of North Carolina at Chapel Hill's summer program in 2002.

Sells also published three volumes on Arabic poetry, Desert Tracings: Six Classic Arabian Odes, Stations of Desire, and The Cambridge History of Arabic Literature, Al-Andalus, which he co-edited and to which he contributed. His books on mysticism include Early Islamic Mysticism, translations and commentaries on influential mystical passages from the Quran, hadith, Arabic poetry, and early Sufi writings, as well as Mystical Languages of Unsaying, an examination of apophatic language, with special attention to Plotinus, John Scotus Eriugena, ibn Arabi, Meister Eckhart, and Marguerite Porete. His work on religion and violence includes The Bridge Betrayed: Religion and Genocide in Bosnia, and The New Crusades: Constructing the Muslim Enemy which he co-edited and to which he contributed. He teaches courses on the topics of the Qur'an, Islamic love poetry, comparative mystical literature, Arabic Sufi poetry, and ibn Arabi.

Christoslavism
Michael Sells argues that religious mythology played a crucial role in the Bosnian genocide. He wrote about the religious ideology of Christoslavism: 
Sells argues that the Bosnian genocide: 
Sells argues that these acts were seen as ethnoreligious purification:

Personal life

Sells is of Serbian descent.

Bibliography

References

External links
 University of Chicago Homepage
 University of Chicago News Biography

1949 births
American historians of Islam
Middle Eastern studies in the United States
University of Chicago faculty
Living people
21st-century American historians
21st-century American male writers
Mysticism scholars
American male non-fiction writers
University of Chicago Divinity School faculty
American religion academics